The 2016 World Junior Ice Hockey Championship Division I was played in two groups of six teams each. In each group the first-placed team is promoted to a higher level, while the last-placed team is relegated to a lower level.  Divisions I A and I B represent the second and the third tier of the IIHF World U20 Championship.  To be eligible as a "junior" a player couldn't be born earlier than 1996.

The winners of Division I B, France, was promoted to the 2017 Division I A, and the winners of Division I A, Latvia, was promoted to the 2017 top division.

Division I A
The Division I A tournament was played in Vienna, Austria, from 13 to 19 December 2015.

Participants

Final standings

Results
All times are local (UTC+1).

Statistics

Top 10 scorers

Goaltending leaders
(minimum 40% team's total ice time)

Awards

Best Players Selected by the Directorate
 Goaltender:  Matiss Kivlenieks
 Defenceman:  Karlis Cukste
 Forward:  Florian Baltram

Division I B
The Division I B tournament was played in Megève, France, from 12 to 18 December 2015.  On 10 December it was announced that Japan had withdrawn, and would be automatically relegated for the 2017 tournament.

Participants

Final standings

Results
All times are local (UTC+1).

Statistics

Top 10 scorers

GP = Games played; G = Goals; A = Assists; Pts = Points; +/− = Plus-minus; PIM = Penalties In Minutes
Source: IIHF.com

Goaltending leaders
(minimum 40% team's total ice time)

Source: IIHF.com

Awards

Best Players Selected by the Directorate
 Goaltender:  Bogdan Dyachenko
 Defenceman:  Marcin Horzelski
 Forward:  Guillaume Leclerc

References

External links
IIHF.com

I
2016
International ice hockey competitions hosted by Austria
International ice hockey competitions hosted by France
2015–16 in Austrian ice hockey
2015–16 in French ice hockey
Sports competitions in Vienna
Sport in Haute-Savoie
December 2015 sports events in Europe